Dimethylglyoxime is a chemical compound described by the formula CH3C(NOH)C(NOH)CH3. Its abbreviation is dmgH2 for neutral form, and dmgH− for anionic form, where H stands for hydrogen. This colourless solid is the dioxime derivative of the diketone butane-2,3-dione (also known as diacetyl).  DmgH2 is used in the analysis of palladium or nickel. Its coordination complexes are of theoretical interest as models for enzymes and as catalysts.  Many related ligands can be prepared from other diketones, e.g. benzil.

Preparation
Dimethylglyoxime can be prepared from butanone first by reaction with ethyl nitrite to give biacetyl monoxime.  The second oxime is installed using sodium hydroxylamine monosulfonate:

Complexes
Dimethylglyoxime forms complexes with metals including nickel, palladium and cobalt. These complexes are used to separate those cations from solutions of metal salts and in gravimetric analysis. It is also used in precious metals refining to precipitate palladium from solutions of palladium chloride.

References

Ketoximes
Chelating agents